Dalyellia is a genus of rhabdocoel flatworms belonging to the family Dalyelliidae.

The species of this genus are found in Europe, Southern Africa and Northern America.

Species:
 Dalyellia alba Higley, 1918 
 Dalyellia callvucurai Damborenea, Brusa & Noreña, 2007
 Dalyellia viridis (Shaw, 1791)

References

Rhabdocoela
Platyhelminthes genera